This Year's Blonde is a 1980 American made-for-television drama film directed by John Erman and starring Constance Forslund as Marilyn Monroe, Lloyd Bridges as Johnny Hyde, and Norman Fell. Based on the Garson Kanin novel Moviola about Monroe, the film was presented as part of a 3-night TV special event on NBC called Moviola: A Hollywood Saga.

This Year's Blonde was the first of two TV movies about Monroe in 1980, the second being Marilyn: The Untold Story, starring Catherine Hicks.

Cast

Constance Forslund as Marilyn Monroe
Lloyd Bridges as Johnny Hyde
Norman Fell as Pat Toledo
Vic Tayback as Harry Cohn
Michael Lerner as Jack L. Warner
John Marley as Joe Schenck
Richard Seer as Norman
Lee Wallace as Samuel Goldwyn
William Frankfather as John Huston
Philip Sterling as Dr. Freed
Sondra Blake as Mrs. Baker
Barney Martin as Eddie Mannix
Michael Strong as Sol Silverman
Peter Maloney as Darryl Zanuck
Stephen Keep Mills as Dore Schary
Peggy Ann Garner as the Stepmother

See also

 Moviola, 1979 novel by Garson Kanin, source material for this film
 The Scarlett O'Hara War (1980), the third installment of TV miniseries Moviola: A Hollywood Saga

References

External links 
 

1980 television films
1980 films
1980 drama films
American biographical drama films
Films set in Los Angeles
Films set in the 1940s
Films set in the 1950s
Films about Marilyn Monroe
Films based on American novels
NBC network original films
Films directed by John Erman
1980s American films